The 2003 Bowling Green Falcons football team represented Bowling Green State University in the 2003 NCAA Division I-A football season. The team was coached by Gregg Brandon and played their home games in Doyt Perry Stadium in Bowling Green, Ohio. It was the 85th season of play for the Falcons.

Schedule

References

Bowling Green
Bowling Green Falcons football seasons
Little Caesars Pizza Bowl champion seasons
Bowling Green Falcons football